Elizabeth Weaver (March 28, 1941 – April 21, 2015) was a justice of the Michigan Supreme Court from 1995 to 2010 and served as chief justice from 1999 to 2001.

Life
Weaver was born in New Orleans, Louisiana. She received her Bachelor of Arts degree in 1962 from H. Sophie Newcomb Memorial College. In 1965, she received her Juris Doctor from Tulane University Law School and was admitted to the Louisiana bar. During law school, she was an editor of the Tulane Law Review. After graduating from Tulane, she began her practice working with the Chevron Corporation and a private law firm in New Orleans. She eventually relocated to Michigan, where she taught first grade and served as the dean of girls at The Leelanau School in Glen Arbor. In 1973, Weaver was admitted to the Michigan bar. In 1974, she was elected as Leelanau County's probate court judge. In 1987, she was elected to the Michigan Court of Appeals and was re-elected in 1992.

She is the author (with David B. Schock, Ph.D.) of Judicial Deceit: Tyranny and Unnecessary Secrecy at the Michigan Supreme Court, a telling of the history of the court during her tenure. Her contention was that the court had been overtaken in its thought by appointees of former Governor John M. Engler. During her tenure other members of what she called the Engler Four roundly attacked her, even to the point of trying to silence her public comment with a gag order, Administrative Order 2006-08. During her time at the high court she remained steadfast that the people of Michigan had a right to know what was going on at the court as long as the matter at hand was not pending or impending an outlined in Canon 3A (6) of the Michigan Code of Judicial Conduct Even after she left the court she was a staunch critic of behavior of the other justices in revealing racist comments made but Robert Preston Young, Jr., at the time of his re-election in 2010, the court made an ill-fated attempt to censure her. They sent her a letter telling her that she was censured without apparently remembering that the Michigan Supreme Court can censure ONLY on the recommendation of the state Judicial Tenure Commission (per the State Constitution of Michigan of 1963, Article VI, Section 30), something that had not happened. In publishing her book in 2013, Weaver noted that it was the last remaining obligation she had to the citizens of Michigan.

Weaver died on April 21, 2015, in her Glen Arbor home. She was 74.

References

1941 births
2015 deaths
People from New Orleans
Tulane University Law School alumni
Louisiana lawyers
Michigan lawyers
Educators from Michigan
American women educators
Chief Justices of the Michigan Supreme Court
Michigan Court of Appeals judges
Michigan state court judges
Educators from Louisiana
20th-century American judges
20th-century American lawyers
20th-century American women judges
21st-century American women
Justices of the Michigan Supreme Court
21st-century American women judges
21st-century American judges